Gregory Wayne Glover (born 13 April 1969) is the host of 'Alternative Mornings' and 'The Bottom Forty' on KNRK-FM in Portland, Oregon. He also co-founded the Arena Rock Recording Company along with Dan Ralph in 1995 and is now the sole owner of the label.

He joined KNRK-FM in October 2005. He was a part of Audacy's major layoff in September 2020 when the company decided to use nationwide personalities for all their radio stations. He was brought back to KNRK-FM almost exactly two years later when Audacy decided to return to local radio personalities. 

Prior to becoming a radio personality, Glover served as an A&R executive at London Records and Sire Records in New York City. Glover signed Harvey Danger, who had a hit with 'Flagpole Sitta' in 1998.

Glover attended the University of Alabama and the University of South Florida where he graduated in 1995 with a degree in English Literature.

He was born in Dallas, Texas and grew up in Birmingham, Alabama.

References 

Living people
1969 births